Murders in the Greenstreet (German:Der Mord in der Greenstreet) is a 1921 German silent film directed by Johannes Guter and starring Lil Dagover.

The film's art direction was by Franz Seemann.

Cast
In alphabetical order
 Erwin Baron 
 Lil Dagover 
 Hugo Flink 
 Emil Heyse 
 Sophie Pagay 
 Vasilij Vronski
 Yuri Yurovsky

References

Bibliography
 Hans-Michael Bock and Tim Bergfelder. The Concise Cinegraph: An Encyclopedia of German Cinema. Berghahn Books.

External links

1921 films
Films of the Weimar Republic
Films directed by Johannes Guter
German silent feature films
UFA GmbH films
Films produced by Erich Pommer
German black-and-white films